Teleonemia nigrina is a species of lace bug in the family Tingidae. It is found in Central America and North America.

References

Further reading

External links

 

Tingidae
Articles created by Qbugbot
Insects described in 1898